During his reign, Pope John Paul II ("The Pilgrim Pope") made 104 foreign trips, more than all previous popes combined. He consistently attracted large crowds on his travels, some among the largest ever assembled. While some of his trips (such as to the United States and Israel) were to places that were previously visited by Paul VI (the first pope to travel widely), many others were to countries that no pope had previously visited.

Countries visited

Pope John Paul II visited 129 countries during his time as pope:

Nine visits to Poland
Eight visits to France (including one visit to Réunion)
Seven visits to the United States (including two stopovers in Alaska)
Five visits to Mexico and Spain
Four visits to Brazil, Portugal, and Switzerland
Three visits to Austria, Canada, Côte d'Ivoire, Croatia, Czech Republic (including one visit to Czechoslovakia), Dominican Republic, Germany, Guatemala, Kenya, Malta (including one stopover in Luqa,) and Slovakia (including one visit to Czechoslovakia)
Two visits to Argentina, Australia, Belgium, Benin, Bosnia-Herzegovina, Burkina Faso, Cameroon, Democratic Republic of the Congo, El Salvador, Hungary, India, Nicaragua, Nigeria, Papua New Guinea, Peru, Philippines, Slovenia, South Korea, Uruguay, and Venezuela
One visit to Albania, Angola, Armenia, Azerbaijan, Bahamas, Bangladesh, Belize, Bolivia, Botswana, Bulgaria, Burundi, Cape Verde, Central African Republic, Chad, Chile, Colombia, Congo, Costa Rica, Cuba, Denmark, East Timor (then part of Indonesia), Ecuador, Egypt, Equatorial Guinea, Estonia, Fiji, Finland, Gabon, Gambia, Georgia, Ghana, Greece, Guam, Guinea, Guinea-Bissau, Haiti, Honduras, Iceland, Indonesia, Ireland, Israel, Jamaica, Japan, Jordan, Kazakhstan, Latvia, Lebanon, Lesotho, Liechtenstein, Lithuania, Luxembourg, Madagascar, Malawi, Mali, Mauritius, Morocco, Mozambique, Netherlands, New Zealand, Norway, Pakistan, Palestinian territories, Panama, Paraguay, Romania, Rwanda, Saint Lucia, San Marino, São Tomé and Príncipe, Senegal, Seychelles, Singapore, Solomon Islands, South Africa, Sri Lanka, Sudan, Swaziland, Sweden, Syria, Tanzania, Thailand, Togo, Trinidad and Tobago, Tunisia, Turkey, Uganda, Ukraine, United Kingdom, Zambia, and Zimbabwe.

In addition, John Paul II made 146 pastoral visits within Italy.

Travels outside Italy

1970s

Pope John Paul II's first foreign journey was a three-country visit to the Dominican Republic, Mexico and the Bahamas in January 1979. Some 18 million people were believed to have greeted the Pope during his stay in Mexico.

The Pope's second foreign visit was to his homeland, Poland, in June 1979. This was possibly the most significant of all his trips as it, according to some historians, set in train a series of events that led to the establishment of the Solidarity trade union, which was a key movement in the fall of Communism in eastern Europe. During his visit to Poland, John Paul visited Warsaw, Gniezno, Kraków, Nowy Targ, Auschwitz and Jasna Gora. The nine-day tour attracted millions of faithful.

The Pope's visit to Ireland on 29 September drew immense crowds. 1,250,000 people, one quarter of the population of the island of Ireland, one third of the population of the Republic of Ireland, attended the opening Mass of the visit in Dublin's Phoenix Park. Over 250,000 attended a Liturgy of the Word in Drogheda later that evening. Hundreds of thousands lined the streets of Dublin that night for a motorcade from Dublin Airport to the Presidential Residence in the Phoenix Park.

The following day, Sunday 30 September, included Masses in Galway (300,000), Knock (450,000) and a stop over at the monastic ruins of Clonmacnois (20,000). The final day of the visit began with a visit to the National Seminary in Maynooth (attended by 80,000). The final Mass of the visit was at Greenpark Racecourse in Limerick in the south of the country before 400,000 people which was more than had been expected.

John Paul II made his first visit to the United States in October 1979. He arrived in Boston on 1 October. The next two days were spent in New York City, where he addressed the United Nations General Assembly.  There he condemned all uses of concentration camps and torture on the 40th anniversary year of World War II's start in 1939 and subsequent establishment of such camps by both the invading German Nazis and Soviet Communists, with Communism's camps and tortures continuing after the war's end in 1945. The pope later spoke to students gathered at Madison Square Garden, and conducted Mass at the original Yankee Stadium for 75,000 people as well as at Shea Stadium to an audience of over 52,000. He arrived in Philadelphia on 3 October and Des Moines, Iowa on the next day before arriving in Chicago. There he celebrated Mass in Grant Park, met with civic leaders and Chicago's Polish community. Chicago was the largest Catholic archdiocese in the United States at the time and the home of the largest Polish community outside of Poland. He concluded his pilgrimage to the U.S. in Washington, D.C. where he became the first Pope to visit the White House. He was greeted warmly by President Jimmy Carter, and they met privately in the Oval Office.

1980s 
On 3 June 1980, he made a pilgrimage to Lisieux in northern France, the home town of St. Therese of the Child Jesus of the Holy Face. In 1997 he declared St. Therese the third woman Doctor of the Church. His 1980 visit to France was the first by a pope since 1814 and his journey to West Germany in November 1980 was the first since 1782.

On 18 February 1981, he beatified several martyrs, including those later canonized, St. Lorenzo Ruiz and Magdalene of Nagasaki, in Manila. This was the first beatification to be held outside Vatican City. He became the first reigning pope to travel to the United Kingdom in 1982, where he met Queen Elizabeth II, the Supreme Governor of the Church of England. This trip was in danger of being cancelled due to the then current Falklands War, against which he spoke out during the visit. In a dramatic symbolic gesture, he knelt in prayer alongside Archbishop of Canterbury Robert Runcie, in the See of the Church of England, Canterbury Cathedral, founded by St Augustine of Canterbury. They prayed at the site of the martyrdom of St. Thomas Becket, meant as a show of friendship between the Roman Catholic and Anglican churches. Pope John Paul II was the first Pontiff to visit Scotland, where about 300,000 of the Roman Catholic minority in that country celebrated Mass with the Pope at Bellahouston Park. On this visit the Pope faced protest from Protestant pastor Jack Glass and his followers. This visit had to be balanced for fairness with an unscheduled trip to Argentina that June.

Throughout his trips, he stressed his devotion to the Virgin Mary through visits to various shrines to the Virgin Mary, notably Knock in Ireland, Fatima in Portugal, Guadalupe in Mexico, Aparecida in Brazil and Lourdes in France.

In 1984, John Paul became the first Pope to visit Puerto Rico. Stands were specially erected for him at Luis Muñoz Marín International Airport in San Juan, where he met with governor Carlos Romero Barceló, and at Plaza Las Americas.

The pope made a pastoral trip to Singapore in 1986, and was received by the
Prime Minister Lee Kuan Yew in the Istana. Following that, the Pope made pastoral speeches concerning the Catholic doctrines in the National Stadium of Singapore, which was viewed by a large audience.

1990s
The Pope's foreign travel programme for 1994 was suspended due to a fall resulting in hip-replacement surgery. Visits to Belgium, the United States, and Lebanon were cancelled as a result. The visits to Belgium and the United States took place in 1995, while the visit to Lebanon was delayed until 1997.

There was a plot to assassinate the Pope during his visit to Manila in January 1995, as part of Operation Bojinka, a mass terrorist attack that was developed by Al-Qaeda members Ramzi Yousef and Khalid Sheik Mohammed. A suicide bomber dressed as a priest and planned to use the disguise to get closer to the Pope's motorcade so that he could kill the Pope by detonating himself. Before 15 January, the day on which the men were to attack the Pope during his Philippine visit, an apartment fire brought investigators led by Aida Fariscal to Yousef's laptop computer, which had terrorist plans on it, as well as clothes and items that suggested an assassination plot. Yousef was arrested in Pakistan about a month later, but Khalid Sheik Mohammed was not arrested until 2003. During this trip to the Philippines, on 15 January 1995, the Pope offered Mass to an estimated crowd of 4–5 million in Luneta Park, Manila, the largest papal crowd ever. On 19 September 1996, the Pope traveled to Saint-Laurent-sur-Sèvre, France to meditate and pray st the adjacent tombs of Saint Louis de Montfort and Blessed Marie Louise Trichet. On 22 March 1998, during his second visit to Nigeria, he beatified the Nigerian monk Cyprian Michael Iwene Tansi. In 1999, John Paul II made a final trip to the United States, this time celebrating Mass in St. Louis in the Trans World Dome. Over 104,000 people attended the 27 January Mass, making it the biggest indoor gathering in the United States.

2000s 
In 2000, he became the first modern Catholic pope to visit Egypt, where he met with the Coptic Pope and the Greek Orthodox Patriarch of Alexandria.

In May 2001, the Pope took a pilgrimage that would trace the steps of his co-namesake, Saint Paul, across the Mediterranean, from Greece to Syria to Malta. John Paul II became the first Pope to visit Greece in 1291 years. The visit was controversial, and the Pontiff was met with protests and snubbed by Eastern Orthodox leaders, none of whom met his arrival.

In Athens, the Pope met with Archbishop Christodoulos, the head of the Greek Orthodox Church in Greece. After a private 30 minute meeting, the two spoke publicly. Christodoulos read a list of "13 offences" of the Roman Catholic Church against the Orthodox Church since the Great Schism, including the pillaging of Constantinople by Crusaders in 1204. He also bemoaned the lack of any apology from the Roman Catholic Church, saying that "until now, there has not been heard a single request for pardon" for the "maniacal crusaders of the 13th century".

The Pope responded by saying, "For the occasions past and present, when sons and daughters of the Catholic Church have sinned by action or omission against their Orthodox brothers and sisters, may the Lord grant us forgiveness", to which Christodoulos immediately applauded. John Paul also said that the sacking of Constantinople was a source of "deep regret" for Catholics.

Later, John Paul and Christodoulos met on a spot where Saint Paul had once preached to Athenian Christians. They issued a "common declaration", saying, "We shall do everything in our power, so that the Christian roots of Europe and its Christian soul may be preserved. ... We condemn all recourse to violence, proselytism and fanaticism, in the name of religion." The two leaders then said the Lord's Prayer together, breaking an Orthodox taboo against praying with Catholics.

He was the first Catholic Pope to visit and pray in a Mosque, in Damascus, Syria. He visited the Umayyad Mosque, where John the Baptist is believed to be interred.

In September 2001 amid post-September 11 concerns, he travelled to Kazakhstan, with an audience of largely Muslims, and to Armenia, to participate in the celebration of the 1700 years of Christianity in that nation. The Pope's final visit was to the Marian Shrine of Lourdes in the south of France.

Travels in Italy

1970s
  October 29, 1978: Sanctuary of the Mentorella 
  November 5, 1978: Assisi
  May 18, 1979: Montecassino
  August 14, 1979: Albano Laziale
  August 26, 1979: Canale d'Agordo, Malga Ciapela, Marmolada di Rocca, Belluno and Treviso
  September 1, 1979: Nettuno
  September 3, 1979: Albano Laziale
  September 8, 1979: Loreto and Ancona
  September 9, 1979: Grottaferrata
  September 13, 1979: Pomezia
  October 21, 1979: Pompeii

1980s
  March 23, 1980: Cascia and Norcia
  April 13, 1980: Turin
  August 30, 1980: Assergi, Traforo del Gran Sasso and L'Aquila
  September 7, 1980: Velletri
  September 8, 1980: Frascati
  September 14, 1980: Siena
  September 20, 1980: Montecassino and Cassino
  September 28, 1980: Subiaco
  October 5, 1980: Galatina and Otranto
  November 25, 1980: Potenza, Balvano and Avellino
  March 19, 1981: Terni
  April 26, 1981: Orio al Serio, Sotto il Monte and Bergamo
  November 22, 1981: Collevalenza and Todi
  March 12, 1982: Assisi
  March 19, 1982: Rosignano Solvay, Livorno and Sanctuary of Montenero
  April 18, 1982: Bologna and San Lazzaro di Savena
  August 29, 1982: Rimini
  September 5, 1982: Serra Sant'Abbondio and Fonte Avellana
  September 12, 1982: Rubano and Padua
  September 19, 1982: Albano Laziale
  September 29, 1982: Ghedi, Concesio and Brescia
  November 20 and 21, 1982: Ponte Valle, Belice and Palermo
  January 2, 1983: Rieti and Greccio
  March 19, 1983: San Salvo, Termoli and Pescara
  May 20–22, 1983: Milan, Desio, Seregno, Venegono, Monza and Sesto San Giovanni
  August 18, 1983: Palestrina
  September 3, 1983: Anzio
  February 26, 1984: Bari and Bitonto
  May 27, 1984: Viterbo
  July 16–17, 1984: Mount Adamello
  August 12, 1984: Fano
  August 19, 1984: Rocca di Papa
  September 2, 1984: Alatri
  October 5 – 7, 1984: Lamezia Terme, Serra San Bruno, Paola, Catanzaro, Cosenza, Crotone and Reggio di Calabria
  November 2 – 4, 1984: Milan, Varese, Pavia, Varallo and Arona
  December 29, 1984: Grottaferrata
  March 24, 1985: Fucino and Avezzano
  April 11, 1985: Loreto
  May 26, 1985: Salerno
  June 15–17, 1985: Vittorio Veneto, Riese Pio X, Treviso, Venice and Mestre
  June 30, 1985: Atri, Isola del Gran Sasso and Teramo
  September 14, 1985: Albano Laziale
  September 21 – 22, 1985: Genoa and Shrine of Nostra Signora della Guardia
  October 18–20, 1985: Cagliari, Iglesias, Oristano, Nuoro and Sassari
  March 19, 1986: Prato
  May 8–11, 1986: Forlì, Cesena, Imola, Faenza, Brisighella, Ravenna and Cervia
  August 9, 1986: Rocca di Mezzo and Piani di Pezza
  August 31, 1986: Anagni
  September 6 – 7, 1986: Aosta, Courmayeur and Mont Blanc
  September 14, 1986: Aprilia
  October 18 and 19, 1986: Fiesole and Florence
  October 26, 1986: Perugia
  October 27, 1986: Assisi
In this trip, the pope has an encounter with leaders of several religions in a prayer for the peace.
  March 19, 1987: Civitavecchia
  May 23 – 25, 1987: San Giovanni Rotondo, Monte Sant'Angelo, Manfredonia, Foggia, San Severo, Lucera, Troia, Bovino, Ascoli Satriano and Cerignola
  July 8 – 14, 1987: Lorenzago di Cadore, San Pietro di Cadore and Fortogna
  September 2, 1987: Rocca di Papa
  September 5, 1987: Albano Laziale
  September 7, 1987: Grottaferrata
  April 16 and 17, 1988: Verona
  May 1, 1988: Castel Sant'Elia, Civita Castellana and Nepi
  June 3 – 7, 1988: Carpi, Modena, Fiorano, Fidenza, Piacenza, Castel San Giovanni, Reggio Emilia, Parma and Bologna
  June 11 and 12, 1988: Messina, Tindari and Reggio di Calabria
  July 13 – 22, 1988: Lorenzago di Cadore, Mount Adamello, Col Cumano, Sanctuary of Pietralba and Tesero
  August 19, 1988: Albano Laziale
  August 21, 1988: Rocca di Papa
  September 2 – 4, 1988: Turin, Castelnuovo Don Bosco, Colle Don Bosco and Chieri
  December 30, 1988: Fermo and Porto San Giorgio
  May 21, 1989: Grosseto
  June 25, 1989: Gaeta, Sanctuary of the Madonna della Civita and Formia
  July 12 – 21, 1989: Introd, Oropa, Pollone, Quart and Turin
  September 18, 1989: Orte and Trevignano Romano
  September 22–24, 1989: Pisa, Cecina, Volterra and Lucca
  October 28 and 29, 1989: Taranto and Martina Franca

1990s
  March 18 and 19, 1990: Ivrea, San Benigno Canavese, Scarmagno and Chivasso
  June 17, 1990: Orvieto
  July 2, 1990: Benevento
  July 11 – 20, 1990: Introd, Barmasc and Mont Blanc
  September 20, 1990: Albano Laziale
  September 22 and 23, 1990: Ferrara, Pomposa, Comacchio and Argenta
  October 14, 1990: Genoa
  November 9 – 13, 1990: Naples, Torre del Greco, Pozzuoli, Nocera Inferiore, Pagani, Aversa, Trentola-Ducenta, Casapesenna and Lusciano
  March 18 and 19, 1991: San Severino Marche, Camerino, Fabriano and Matelica
  April 27 and 28, 1991: Matera, Pisticci and Potenza
  June 22 and 23, 1991: Mantua and Castiglione delle Stiviere
  July 10 – 19, 1991: Introd, Susa, Sacra di San Michele and Breuil-Cervinia
  September 2, 1991: Carpineto Romano
  September 7 and 8, 1991: Vicenza
  September 29, 1991: Le Ferriere
  March 19, 1992: Sorrento and Castellammare di Stabia
  April 30 – May 3, 1992: Aquileia, Pordenone, San Vito al Tagliamento, Concordia Sagittaria, Trieste, Gorizia, Gemona del Friuli, Udine and Redipuglia War Memorial
  May 23 and 24, 1992: Nola, Caserta, Santa Maria Capua Vetere and Capua
  June 19 – 21, 1992: Caravaggio, Crema, Lodi and Cremona
  August 17 – September 2, 1992: Lorenzago di Cadore and Domegge di Cadore
  January 9 and 10, 1993: Assisi
  March 19, 1993: Magliano Sabina, Vescovio, Poggio Mirteto, Abbey of Farfa and Monterotondo
  April 22, 1993: Genazzano
  May 8–10, 1993: Trapani, Erice, Mazara del Vallo, Agrigento and Caltanissetta
  May 23, 1993: Cortona
  June 19 and 20, 1993: Macerata, Foligno and Gran Sasso
  July 7 – 16, 1993: Lorenzago di Cadore and Santo Stefano di Cadore
  September 17, 1993: Sanctuary of La Verna and Camaldoli
  September 25 and 26, 1993: Asti and Isola d'Asti
  August 17 – 27, 1994: Introd
  September 17 and 18, 1994: Lecce
  November 4 and 5, 1994: Catania and Siracusa
  December 10, 1994: Loreto
  March 19, 1995: Campobasso, Monte Vairano, Castelpetroso and Agnone
  April 29 and 30, 1995: Trento
  July 12 – 22, 1995: Introd
  September 9 and 10, 1995: Loreto
  November 23, 1995: Palermo
  March 30, 1996: Colle Val d'Elsa
  May 4 and 5, 1996: Como
  July 10 – 23, 1996: Lorenzago di Cadore and Pieve di Cadore
  August 14, 1996: Albano Laziale
  August 9 – 19, 1997: Introd
  September 6, 1997: Marino
  September 27 – 28, 1997: Bologna
  January 3, 1998: Annifo, Cesi and Assisi
  May 23 and 24, 1998: Vercelli and Turin
  July 8 – 21, 1998: Lorenzago di Cadore and Borno
  September 18–20, 1998: Chiavari and Brescia
  May 30, 1999: Ancona
  July 7 – 20, 1999: Introd and Quart
  September 4, 1999: Pontecagnano-Faiano and Salerno

2000s
  July 10 – 22, 2000: Introd
  July 9 – 20, 2001: Introd
  September 16, 2001: Frosinone
  January 24, 2002: Assisi
  May 5, 2002: Ischia
  July 24, 2003: Gran Sasso
  October 7, 2003: Pompeii
  July 5 – 17, 2004: Introd
  September 5, 2004: Loreto

See also
 List of pastoral visits of Pope Paul VI
 List of pastoral visits of Pope Benedict XVI
 List of pastoral visits of Pope Francis
 List of meetings between the pope and the president of the United States
 Papal travel
 State visit

References

External links
"Events in the Pontificate of John Paul II" from the Vatican WebCitation archive
1987 Papal visit to Fort Simpson NWT

John Paul II
Lists of 21st-century trips
Personal timelines
Visits
JohnPaul 2